Shirishkumar Surupsing Naik is an Indian politician who is serving as Member of 14th Maharashtra Legislative Assembly from Navapur Assembly constituency.

References 

Maharashtra MLAs 2019–2024
Indian National Congress politicians from Maharashtra
Living people
Year of birth missing (living people)